Dulce Nombre is a municipality in the Honduran department of Copán.

References

Municipalities of the Copán Department